Reader's Digest Condensed Books was a series of hardcover anthology collections, published by the American general interest monthly family magazine Reader's Digest and distributed by direct mail.  Most volumes contained five (although a considerable minority consisted of three, four, or six) current best-selling novels and nonfiction books which were abridged (or "condensed") specifically for Reader's Digest.  The series was published from 1950 until 1997, when it was renamed Reader's Digest Select Editions.

The series was popular; a 1987 New York Times article estimated annual sales of 10 million copies. Despite this popularity, old copies are notoriously difficult to sell. Despite the series' ubiquity, scholarly attention has been sparse.

For much of their publication schedule, the volumes were issued four times each year. Each year the company produced a Volume 1 (winter), Volume 2 (spring), Volume 3 (summer), and Volume 4 (autumn).  In later years they added a Volumes 5, and then a Volume 6, going to a bi-monthly schedule by the early 1990s. The series was produced for 47 years (1950–1997), until being renamed Reader's Digest Select Editions. (Note: UK editions seem to have been somewhat different from USA editions. Pre-1992 Canadian editions also contain different titles.)

Occasional books such as The Leopard (Summer 1960), The Days Were Too Short (Autumn 1960), and Papillon (Autumn 1970) were not published in English originally but were abridgments of translations. In some cases, advanced copies of the hardcover edition were printed in paperback form. In a few cases, new editions of older works (Up from Slavery, published originally in 1901 (Autumn 1960), A Roving Commission: My Early Life, published originally in 1930 (Autumn 1951) or Goodbye Mr. Chips, published originally in 1934 (Summer 1961)) were also among the condensed selections.

1950s

1950

Volume 1 – Spring
 The Show Must Go On – Elmer Rice
 The Cry and the Covenant – Morton Thompson
 Autobiography of Will Rogers – Donald Day, editor
 Cry, the Beloved Country – Alan Paton

Volume 2 – Summer
 The Wooden Horse – Eric Williams
 Home Town – Cleveland Amory
 Visibility Unlimited – Dick Grace
 The Way West – A. B. Guthrie Jr.

Volume 3 – Autumn
 The Cardinal – Henry Morton Robinson
 Long the Imperial Way – Hanama Taski
 Roosevelt in Retrospect – John Gunther
 Young Man with a Horn – Dorothy Baker

1951

Volume 4 – Winter
 Anybody Can Do Anything – Betty MacDonald
 Elephant Bill – Lt. Col. J. H. Williams
 Signal Thirty-Two – MacKinlay Kantor
 German Faces – Ann Stringer and Henry Ries
 Mischief – Charlotte Armstrong

Volume 5 – Spring
Blandings' way – Eric Hodgins
Operation Cicero – Ludwig Carl Moyzisch
Two Soldiers / from collected stories – William Faulkner
The Nymph and the Lamp – Thomas H. Raddall

Volume 6 – Summer
The Caine Mutiny – Herman Wouk
Neither Five nor Three – Helen MacInnes
Old Herbaceous – Reginald Arkell
See How They Run – Don M. Mankiewicz

Volume 7 – Autumn
 Fallen Away – Margaret Culkin Banning
 Return to Paradise – James A. Michener
 A Roving Commission: My Early Life – Winston S. Churchill
 The Southwest Corner – Mildred Walker
 The Arms of Venus – John Appleby

1952

Volume 8 – Winter
 Melville Goodwin, USA – John P. Marquand
 The Cruel Sea – Nicholas Monsarrat
 A Genius in the Family – Hiram Percy Maxim
 "Monarch of Goddess Island" (The Plunderers) – Georges Blond
 To Catch a Thief – David Dodge

Volume 9 – Spring
 Adventures in Two Worlds – A. J. Cronin
 The Gabriel Horn – Felix Holt
 Duveen – S. N. Behrman
 "Kamante and Lulu" (Out of Africa) – Isak Dinesen
 East Side General – Frank G. Slaughter

Volume 10 – Summer
 The Hidden Flower – Pearl S. Buck
 The Dam Busters – Paul Brickhill
 The City Boy – Herman Wouk
 My Cousin Rachel – Daphne du Maurier

Volume 11 – Autumn
 Matador – Barnaby Conrad
 Witness – Whittaker Chambers
 "The Law of the Jungle" (My India) – Jim Corbett
 The President's Lady – Irving Stone

1953

Volume 12 – Winter
 Hunter – J.A. Hunter
 Giant – Edna Ferber
 Through Charley's Door – Emily Kimbrough
 The Best Cartoons from Punch – Marvin Rosenberg & William Cole, editors
 Island Rescue: An Appointment with Venus – Jerrard Tickell

Spring 1953 Selections
Black Widow – Patrick Quentin
The Silent World – Jacques-Yves Cousteau with Frédéric Dumas
East of Eden – John Steinbeck
Karen – Marie Killilea
The Curve and The Tusk – Stuart Cloete

Volume 14 – Summer
 Our Virgin Island – Robb White
 A Bargain with God – Thomas Savage
 Annapurna – Maurice Herzog
 A Good Man – Jefferson Young
 The Intruder – Helen Fowler

Volume 15 – Autumn
 The Bridges at Toko-Ri – James A. Michener
 Beyond This Place – A. J. Cronin
 Life Among the Savages – Shirley Jackson
 My Crowded Solitude – Jack McLaren
 Digby – David Walker

1954

Volume 16 – Winter
 Call Me Lucky: Bing Crosby's Own Story – Bing Crosby with Pete Martin
 Too Late the Phalarope – Alan Paton
 Time and Time Again – James Hilton
 Heather Mary – J. M. Scott

Volume 17 – Spring
 The Night of the Hunter – Davis Grubb
 God and My Country – MacKinlay Kantor
 Not as a Stranger – Morton Thompson
 The Best Cartoons from France – Edna Bennett, collector
 The Young Elizabeth – Jennette & Francis Letton

Volume 18 – Summer
 The Desperate Hours – Joseph Hayes
 General Dean's Story – William F. Dean with William L. Worden
 Mr. Hobbs' Vacation – Edward Streeter
 The Power and the Prize – Howard Swiggett
 "The Duchess and the Smugs" (A Wreath for the Enemy) – Pamela Frankau
 Tomorrow! – Philip Wylie

Volume 19 – Autumn
 The Dollmaker – Harriette Arnow
 The Anatomy of a Crime – Joseph F. Dinneen
 Love is Eternal – Irving Stone
 Around a Rusty God – Augusta Walker
 The High and the Mighty – Ernest K. Gann

1955

Volume 20 – Winter
 The Reason Why – Cecil Woodham-Smith
 The China I Knew (My Several Worlds) – Pearl S. Buck
 My Brother's Keeper – Marcia Davenport
 Good Morning, Miss Dove – Frances Gray Patton
 The Darby Trial – Dick Pearce

Volume 22 – Summer
 Man-Eater – Jim Corbett
 The Actor – Niven Busch
 Onions in the Stew – Betty MacDonald
 The Captive City – John Appleby
 The Missing Macleans – Geoffrey Hoare
 The Searchers – Alan Le May

Volume 21 – Spring
 Good-bye, My Lady – James Street
 The Dowry – Margaret Culkin Banning
 The Day Lincoln Was Shot – Jim Bishop
 The Year the Yankees Lost the Pennant – Douglass Wallop
 Flamingo Feather – Laurens van der Post

Volume 23 – Autumn
 This is Goggle, or the Education of a Father – Bentz Plagemann
 Run Silent, Run Deep – Commander Edward L. Beach, USN
 Marjorie Morningstar – Herman Wouk
 Last of the Curlews – Fred Bodsworth
 First Train to Babylon – Max Ehrlich

1956

Volume 24 – Winter
 "The Secret of the Swamp" (Andersonville) – MacKinlay Kantor
 Island in the Sun – Alec Waugh
 An Episode of Sparrows – Rumer Godden
 Minding Our Own Business – Charlotte Paul
 The Long Ride Home – Bonner McMillion

Volume 25 – Spring
 Captain of the Queens – Captain Harry Grattidge with Richard Collier
 Beloved – Viña Delmar
 In My Father's House – Grace Nies Fletcher
 The Last Hurrah – Edwin O'Connor
 Boon Island – Kenneth Roberts

Volume 26 – Summer
 Old Yeller – Fred Gipson
 Harry Black – David Walker
 The Greer Case – David W. Peck
 A Thing of Beauty – A. J. Cronin
 A Single Pebble – John Hersey

Volume 27 – Autumn
 The Nun's Story – Kathryn Hulme
 Merry Christmas, Mr. Baxter – Edward Streeter
 The Success – Helen Howe
 The Diamond Hitch – Frank O'Rourke
 The Sleeping Partner – Winston Graham

1957

Volume 28 – Winter
 Bon Voyage – Marrijane & Joseph Hayes
 The Tribe That Lost Its Head – Nicholas Monsarrat
 The Philadelphian – Richard Powell
 A Family Party – John O'Hara
 Stopover: Tokyo – John P. Marquand

Volume 29 – Spring
 The Scapegoat – Daphne du Maurier
 The Last Angry Man – Gerald Green
 The Muses Are Heard – Truman Capote
 The Fruit Tramp – Vinnie Williams
 The Enemy Below – Commander D.A. Rayner

Volume 30 – Summer
 The Lady – Conrad Richter
 A Houseful of Love – Marjorie Housepian
 The Three Faces of Eve – Dr. Corbett H. Thigpen, MD & Dr. Hervey M. Cleckley, MD
 Letter from Peking – Pearl S. Buck
 The FBI Story – Don Whitehead
 "Mission to Borneo" (The Spiral Road) – Jan de Hartog

Volume 31 – Autumn
 Lobo – MacKinlay Kantor
 The Century of the Surgeon – Jürgen Thorwald
 By Love Possessed – James Gould Cozzens
 "Duel with a Witch Doctor" (The Spiral Road) – Jan de Hartog
 Warm Bodies – Donald R. Morris

1958

Volume 32 – Winter
 The Green Helmet – Jon Cleary
 Dunbar's Cove – Borden Deal
 The Twentieth Maine – John J. Pullen
 Life at Happy Knoll – John P. Marquand
 The Horsecatcher – Mari Sandoz
 Sharks and Little Fish – Wolfgang Ott

Volume 33 – Spring
 Big Caesar – Charlton Ogburn Jr.
 The Winthrop Woman – Anya Seton
 The Counterfeit Traitor – Alexander Klein
 The Man Who Broke Things – John Brooks
 Murder on My Street – Edwin Lanham

Volume 34 – Summer
 Seidman and Son – Elick Moll
 The Northern Light – A. J. Cronin
 Rough Road Home – Melissa Mather
 A Friend in Power – Carlos H. Baker
 Sun in the Hunter's Eyes – Mark Derby

Volume 35 – Autumn
 Preacher's Kids – Grace Nies Fletcher
 The Steel Cocoon – Bentz Plagemann
 Women and Thomas Harrow – John P. Marquand
 Green Mansions – W. H. Hudson
 Tether's End – Margery Allingham

1959

Volume 36 – Winter
 The Admen – Shepherd Mead
 The Rainbow and the Rose – Nevil Shute
 Mrs. 'Arris Goes to Paris – Paul Gallico
 The Ugly American – William J. Lederer & Eugene Burdick
 The White Room – Elizabeth Coatsworth
 Woman of Straw – Catherine Arley

Volume 37 – Spring
 The Secret Project of Sigurd O'Leary – Martin Quigley
 Dear and Glorious Physician – Taylor Caldwell
 Collision Course – Alvin Moscow
 Jungle Girl – John Moore
 Epitaph for an Enemy – George Barr

Volume 38 – Summer
 The Lion – Joseph Kessel
 The Light Infantry Ball – Hamilton Basso
 A Rockefeller Family Portrait – William Manchester
 "Trail to Abilene" (Born of the Sun) – John H. Culp
 The Big X – Hank Searls

Volume 39 – Autumn
 "West Wind to Hawaii" (Hawaii) – James A. Michener
 Advise and Consent – Allen Drury
 The Miracle of Merriford – Reginald Arkell
 Act One: An Autobiography – Moss Hart
 Flight from Ashiya – Elliott Arnold

1960s

1960

Volume 40 – Winter
 Jeremy Todd – Hamilton Maule
 "From the Farm of Bitterness" (Hawaii) – James A. Michener
 Pioneer, Go Home! – Richard Powell
 The City That Would Not Die – Richard Collier
 King Solomon's Ring – Konrad Z. Lorenz
 The Triumph of Surgery – Jürgen Thorwald

Volume 41 – Spring
 The Final Diagnosis – Arthur Hailey
 Mrs. 'Arris Goes to New York – Paul Gallico
 Strangers in the Forest – Carol Brink
 The Haunting of Hill House – Shirley Jackson
 Wolfpack – William M. Hardy

Volume 42 – Summer
 The Lovely Ambition – Mary Ellen Chase
 Trustee from the Toolroom – Nevil Shute
 The Leopard – Giuseppe di Lampedusa
 Village of Stars – Paul Stanton
 To Kill a Mockingbird – Harper Lee

Volume 43 – Autumn
 Surface at the Pole – Commander James F. Calvert, USN
 The Devil's Advocate – Morris L. West
 Up from Slavery – Booker T. Washington
 "Hook" (The Watchful Gods and Other Stories) – Walter Van Tilburg Clark
 Mistress of Mellyn – Victoria Holt
 The Days Were Too Short – Marcel Pagnol

1961

Volume 44 – Winter
 The Light in the Piazza – Elizabeth Spencer
 Half Angel – Barbara Jefferis
 A Sense of Values – Sloan Wilson
 "Warpath" (Northwest Passage) – Kenneth Roberts
 Marnie – Winston Graham

Volume 45 – Spring
 Fate Is the Hunter – Ernest K. Gann
 Peaceable Lane – Keith Wheeler
 Madame Curie – Ève Curie
 Evil Come, Evil Go – Whit Masterson
 The 'Mozart' Leaves at Nine – Harris Greene

Volume 46 – Summer
 The Winter of Our Discontent – John Steinbeck
 The Agony and the Ecstasy – Irving Stone
 The Making of the President, 1960 – Theodore H. White
 "A Lodging for the Emperor" (Japanese Inn) – Oliver Statler
 Goodbye, Mr. Chips – James Hilton

Volume 47 – Autumn
 Ring of Bright Water – Gavin Maxwell
 The Judas Tree – A. J. Cronin
 The Edge of Sadness – Edwin O'Connor
 A Fall of Moondust – Arthur C. Clarke
 A Christmas Carol – Charles Dickens
 Summer of Pride – Elizabeth Savage

1962

Volume 48 – Winter
 Spencer's Mountain – Earl Hamner Jr.
 A Prologue to Love – Taylor Caldwell
 A Time to Stand – Walter Lord
 Give It Back to the Lemongrowers! – Willard Temple
 Kirkland Revels – Victoria Holt

Volume 49 – Spring
 Captain Newman, MD – Leo Rosten
 Devil Water – Anya Seton
 The Story of San Michele – Axel Munthe
 Nine Hours to Rama – Stanley Wolpert
 Watchers at the Pond – Franklin Russell

Volume 50 – Summer
 The Tuntsa – Teppo Turen with Elizabeth Maddox McCabe
 Youngblood Hawke – Herman Wouk
 "Carol" (The Blood of the Lamb) – Peter De Vries
 Since You Ask Me – Ann Landers
 Star-Raker – Donald Gordon

Volume 51 – Autumn
 Dearly Beloved – Anne Morrow Lindbergh
 "Brickie" (To Love and Corrupt) – Joseph Viertel
 Seven Days in May – Fletcher Knebel & Charles W. Bailey II
 "The Wonderful World of School" (The World Is Young) – Wayne Miller
 Microbe Hunters – Paul de Kruif
 The Golden Rendezvous – Alistair MacLean

1963

Volume 52 – Winter
 Second Growth – Ruth Moore
 To Catch an Angel: Adventures in the World I Cannot See – Robert Russell
 I Take This Land – Richard Powell
 America, America – Elia Kazan
 "Hell Creek Crossing" (The Reivers) – William Faulkner
 Two Hours to Darkness – Antony Trew

Volume 53 – Spring
 A River Ran Out of Eden – James Vance Marshall
 Escape from Red China – Robert Loh with Humphrey Evans
 The Surgeon – W. C. Heinz
 Smith and Jones – Nicholas Monsarrat
 To Sir, With Love – E. R. Braithwaite
 ...and presumed dead – Lucille Fletcher

Volume 54 – Summer
 The Artist – Jan de Hartog
 The Shoes of the Fisherman – Morris L. West
 The Moonflower Vine – Jetta Carleton
 Florence Nightingale – Cecil Woodham-Smith
 The Wild Grapes – Barbara Jefferis

Volume 55 – Autumn
 The Tilsit Inheritance – Catherine Gaskin
 Stranger to the Ground – Richard Bach
 Of Good and Evil – Ernest K. Gann
 When the Legends Die – Hal Borland
 The Battle of the Villa Fiorita – Rumer Godden

1964

Volume 56 – Winter
 Naked Came I: A Novel of Rodin – David Weiss
 Joy in the Morning – Betty Smith
 The Peregrine Falcon – Robert Murphy
 Careful, He Might Hear You – Sumner Locke Elliott
 The Cincinnati Kid – Richard Jessup

Volume 57 – Spring
 Too Young to Be a Grandfather – Willard Temple
 When the Cheering Stopped – Gene Smith
 I Was Dancing – Edwin O'Connor
 Alone – Rear Admiral Richard E. Byrd
 The Hand of Mary Constable – Paul Gallico
 Nerve – Dick Francis

Volume 58 – Summer
 Father to the Man – Bentz Plagemann
 The Spy Who Came in from the Cold – John le Carré
 "Gold Fever" (When the Lion Feeds) – Wilbur A. Smith
 The Vine and the Olive – Margaret Culkin Banning
 The Flight of the Phoenix – Elleston Trevor

Volume 59 – Autumn
 A Song of Sixpence – A.J. Cronin
 Strangers on a Bridge: The Case of Colonel Abel, Soviet Master Spy – James B. Donovan
 Three Blind Mice – Agatha Christie
 Episode – Eric Hodgins
 The Island – Robert Merle

1965

Volume 60 – Winter
 The Sea Flower – Ruth Moore
 The Man – Irving Wallace
 A Ship Called Hope – William B. Walsh, MD
 The Third Day – Joseph Hayes
 The Land Breakers – John Ehle

Volume 61 – Spring
 A Journey to Boston – Mary Ellen Chase
 "Hotel St. Gregory" (Hotel) – Arthur Hailey
 A Pillar of Iron – Taylor Caldwell
 Eighth Moon – Sansan with Bette Lord
 The Ashes of Loda – Andrew Garve

Volume 62 – Summer
 May You Die in Ireland – Michael Kenyon
 Intern – Dr. X
 The Source – James A. Michener
 Night of Camp David – Fletcher Knebel
 A House of Many Rooms – Rodello Hunter

Volume 63 – Autumn
 Airs Above the Ground – Mary Stewart
 Up the Down Staircase – Bel Kaufman
 Those Who Love – Irving Stone
 Kon-Tiki – Thor Heyerdahl
 How Far to Bethlehem? – Norah Lofts

1966

Volume 64 – Winter
 Outpost of Freedom – Captain Roger H. C. Donlon with Warren Rogers
 The Double Image – Helen MacInnes
 The Yearling – Marjorie Kinnan Rawlings
 The Century of the Detective – Jürgen Thorwald
 "The Way of the Eagle" (The Last Eagle)  – Daniel P. Mannix
 So This Is What Happened to Charlie Moe – Douglass Wallop

Volume 65 – Spring
 Hall of Mirrors – John Rowan Wilson
 Avalon – Anya Seton
 Children of Hope – Elsie E. Vignec
 Congo Kitabu – Jean-Pierre Hallet with Alex Pelle
 Power Play – The Gordons

Volume 66 – Summer
 Rafe – Weldon Hill
 Churchill: The Struggle for Survival – Lord Moran
 Here Come the Brides – Geraldine Napier
 The Ninety and Nine – William Brinkley
 Menfreya in the Morning – Victoria Holt

Volume 67 – Autumn
 Don Quixote, U.S.A. – Richard Powell
 All in the Family – Edwin O'Connor
 Saturday the Rabbi Went Hungry – Harry Kemelman
 The Gift of the Deer – Helen Hoover
 Brothers of the Sea – D.R. Sherman

1967

Volume 68 – Winter
 The Town and Dr. Moore – Agatha Young
 The Captain – Jan de Hartog
 Flight from a Firing Wall – Baynard Kendrick
 The Headmaster – John McPhee
 I Start Counting – Audrey Erskine Lindop

Volume 69 – Spring
 My Boy John That Went to Sea – James Vance Marshall
 One Summer in Between – Melissa Mather
 The Broken Seal – Ladislas Farago
 Dibs in Search of Self – Virginia Axline
 The Road – John Ehle
 Sally – E. V. Cunningham

Volume 70 – Summer
 The Princess – Gunnar Mattsson
 At Ease: Stories I Tell to Friends – Dwight D. Eisenhower
 The Least One – Borden Deal
 Currahee! – Donald R. Burgett
 The Walking Stick – Winston Graham

Volume 71 – Autumn
 Christy – Catherine Marshall
 Life with Father – Clarence Day
 The Fox and the Hound – Daniel P. Mannix
 Nicholas and Alexandra – Robert K. Massie
 The Gabriel Hounds – Mary Stewart

1968

Volume 72 – Winter
 Edge of Glass – Catherine Gaskin
 Great Elephant – Alan Scholefield
 Color from a Light Within – Donald Braider
 The Kitchen Madonna – Rumer Godden
 Vanished – Fletcher Knebel

Volume 73 – Spring
 The New Year – Pearl S. Buck
 The Tower of Babel – Morris L. West
 Airport – Arthur Hailey
 To the Top of the World – Charles Kuralt
 The Bait – Dorothy Uhnak

Volume 74 – Summer
 Once Upon an Island – David Conover
 Bush Baby – Martin Woodhouse
 The Queen's Confession – Victoria Holt
 Leafy Rivers – Jessamyn West
 The Crossbreed – Allan W. Eckert

Volume 75 – Autumn
 The Johnstown Flood – David G. McCullough
 Once an Eagle – Anton Myrer
 Ammie, Come Home – Barbara Michaels
 Gone: A Trio of Short Stories – Rumer Godden
 Sarang – Roger A. Caras

1969

Volume 76 – Winter
 Miss One Thousand Spring Blossoms – John Ball
 The Hurricane Years – Cameron Hawley
 The Wine and the Music – William E. Barrett
 On Reflection – Helen Hayes with Sandford Dody
 The Black Ship – Paul & Sheila Mandel

Volume 77 – Spring
 The Two of Us – Claude Berri
 Bichu the Jaguar – Alan Caillou
 The Minister – Charles Mercer
 Mayo: The Story of My Family and My Career – Dr. Charles W. Mayo
 Torregreca – Ann Cornelisen
 April Morning – Howard Fast

Volume 78 – Summer
 A Place in the Woods – Helen Hoover
 The Death Committee – Noah Gordon
 The Man from Monticello: An Intimate Life of Thomas Jefferson – Thomas Fleming
 The Three Daughters of Madame Liang – Pearl S. Buck
 Snatch – Rennie Airth

Volume 79 – Autumn
 The King's Pleasure – Norah Lofts
 The Day the World Ended – Gordon Thomas & Max Morgan-Witts
 My Life with Martin Luther King Jr. – Coretta Scott King
 In This House of Brede – Rumer Godden
 The Black Camels – Ronald Johnston

1970s

1970

Volume 80 – Winter
 Waiting for Willa – Dorothy Eden
 A Walk to the Hills of the Dreamtime – James Vance Marshall
 T.R. – Noel B. Gerson
 Heartsblood – Paul Marttin
 The Witness – Dorothy Uhnak

Volume 81 – Spring
 Kim: A Gift from Vietnam – Frank W. Chinnock
 Bless the Beasts & Children – Glendon Swarthout
 Great Lion of God – Taylor Caldwell
 I Chose Prison – James V. Bennett
 Fiona – Catherine Gaskin

Volume 82 – Summer
 Operation Sippacik – Rumer Godden
 The Secret Woman – Victoria Holt
 Christiaan Barnard – One Life – Christiaan Barnard & Curtis Bill Pepper
 The Song of Bernadette – Franz Werfel
 The Shattered Dream – Gene Smith

Volume 83 – Autumn
 Lone Woman – Dorothy Clarke Wilson
 The Homecoming – Earl Hamner Jr.
 Papillon – Henri Charrière
 Whitewater – Paul Horgan
 The Unexpected Mrs. Pollifax – Dorothy Gilman

1971

Volume 84 – Winter
 The Crossing – Howard Fast
 Kinds of Love – May Sarton
 The Antagonists – Ernest K. Gann
 Love Story – Erich Segal
 Another Part of the House – Winston M. Estes

Volume 85 – Spring
 Halic: The Story of a Gray Seal – Ewan Clarkson
 Time and Again – Jack Finney
 Six-Horse Hitch – Janice Holt Giles
 Bomber – Len Deighton
 A Woman in the House – Wm. E. Barrett

Volume 86 – Summer
 The White Dawn – James Houston
 Risk – Rachel MacKenzie
 Lifeboat Number Two – Margaret Culkin Banning
 Because I Loved Him: The Life and Loves of Lillie Langtry – Noel B. Gerson
 The Sea of Grass – Conrad Richter
 The Possession of Joel Delaney – Ramona Stewart

Volume 87 – Autumn
 A Timeless Place – Ellen Bromfield Geld
 The San Francisco Earthquake – Gordon Thomas & Max Morgan-Witts
 Wheels – Arthur Hailey
 People I Have Loved, Known or Admired – Leo Rosten
 Summer of the Red Wolf – Morris West

1972

Volume 88 – Winter
 The Amazing Mrs. Pollifax – Dorothy Gilman
 The Winds of War – Herman Wouk
 The Runaways – Victor Canning

Volume 89 – Spring
 Wild Goose, Brother Goose – Mel Ellis
 Event 1000 – David Lavallee
 Bring Me a Unicorn – Anne Morrow Lindbergh
 Hearts – Thomas Thompson
 The Day of the Jackal – Frederick Forsyth

Volume 90 – Summer
 A Falcon for a Queen – Catherine Gaskin
 Meeting With a Great Beast – Leonard Wibberley
 Blockbuster – Gerald Green
 The Shape of Illusion – Wm. E.Barrett
 Duel in the Snow – Hans Meissner

Volume 91 – Autumn
 The Waltz Kings: Johann Strauss, Father & Son, and Their Romantic Age – Hans Fantel
 The Terminal Man – Michael Crichton
 The Dwelling Place – Catherine Cookson
 A World to Care For – Howard A. Rusk, MD
 The Hessian – Howard Fast

1973

Volume 92 – #1
 The Stepford Wives – Ira Levin
 The Odessa File – Frederick Forsyth
 A Day No Pigs Would Die – Robert Newton Peck
 Stanfield Harvest – Richard Martin Stern
 P.S. Your Not Listening – Eleanor Craig

Volume 93 – #2
 A Palm for Mrs. Pollifax – Dorothy Gilman
 The Camerons – Robert Crichton
 The Japanese – Jack Seward
 Green Darkness – Anya Seton

Volume 94 – #3
 Sadie Shapiro's Knitting Book – Robert Kimmel Smith
 The Years of the Forest – Helen Hoover
 The Taking of Pelham One Two Three – John Godey
 The Curse of the Kings – Victoria Holt
 Captain Bligh and Mr. Christian – Richard Hough

Volume 95 – #4
 La Balsa: The Longest Raft Voyage in History – Vital Alsar with Enrique Hank Lopez
 The Sunbird – Wilbur Smith
 State Trooper – Noel B. Gerson
 The Search for Anna Fisher – Florence Fisher
 Mrs. Starr Lives Alone – Jon Godden

Volume 96 – #5
 All Creatures Great and Small – James Herriot
 The Salamander – Morris West
 A Thousand Summers – Garson Kanin
 Shipwreck: The Strange Fate of the Morro Castle – Gordon Thomas and Max Morgan-Witts

1974

Volume 97 – #1
 The Tower – Richard Martin Stern
 Incident at Hawk's Hill – Allan W. Eckert
 Stay of Execution: A Sort of Memoir – Stewart Alsop
 The Mountain Farm – Ernest Raymond
 The Thirteenth Trick – Russell Braddon

Volume 98 – #2
 A Member of the Family – Mary Carter
 The Kappillan of Malta – Nicholas Monsarrat
 In Darkness – Roger Bourgeon
 Jaws – Peter Benchley

Volume 99 – #3
 The Will of Magda Townsend – Margaret Culkin Banning
 Forever Island – Patrick D. Smith
 Thirty-Four East – Alfred Coppel
 The Diddakoi – Rumer Godden
 Lion in the Evening – Alan Scholefield

Volume 100 – #4
 The Boy Who Invented the Bubble Gun – Paul Gallico
 The Good Shepherd – Thomas Fleming
 The Property of a Gentleman – Catherine Gaskin
 His Majesty's U-Boat – Douglas Reeman

Volume 101 – #5
 The Other Room – Borden Deal
 The Dogs of War – Frederick Forsyth
 All Things Bright and Beautiful – James Herriot
 Malevil – Robert Merle
 A Daughter of Zion – Rodello Hunter

1975

Volume 102 – #1
 Our John Willie – Catherine Cookson
 Centennial – James A. Michener
 Harlequin – Morris West
 Eric – Doris Lund

Volume 103 – #2
 Lost! – Thomas Thompson
 Baker's Hawk – Jack Bickham
 The Physicians – Henry Denker
 God and Mr. Gomez – Jack Smith
 Eagle in the Sky – Wilbur Smith

Volume 104 – #3
 Mrs. 'arris Goes to Moscow – Paul Gallico
 The Moneychangers – Arthur Hailey
 The Massacre at Fall Creek – Jessamyn West
 Collision – Spencer Dunmore

Volume 105 – #4
 Where are the Children? – Mary Higgins Clark
 Earthsound – Arthur Herzog
 The Eagle Has Landed – Jack Higgins
 Daylight Must Come – Alan Burgess
 The Wind at Morning – James Vance Marshall

Volume 106 – #5
 Lord of the Far Island – Victoria Holt
 Alexander Dolgun's Story: An American in the Gulag – Alexander Dolgun with Patrick Watson
 Minnie Santangelo's Mortal Sin – Anthony Mancini
 A Sporting Proposition – James Aldridge
 Power – Richard Martin Stern

1976

Volume 107 – #1
 The Great Train Robbery – Michael Crichton
 I Take Thee, Serenity – Daisy Newman
 Bill W. – Robert Thomsen
 A Town Like Alice – Nevil Shute

Volume 108 – #2
 The Hostage Heart – Gerald Green
 They Came to Stay – Marjorie Margolies & Ruth Gruber
 The Tide of Life – Catherine Cookson
 Swan Watch – Budd Schulberg
 Drummer in the Dark – Francis Clifford

Volume 109 – #3
 Liberty Tavern – Thomas Fleming
 The Pilot – Robert Davis
 Touch Not the Cat – Mary Stewart
 The Boys from Brazil – Ira Levin

Volume 110 – #4
 The Distant Summer – Sarah Patterson
 The Olmec Head – David Westheimer
 The Matthew Tree – H. T. Wright
 The Splendid Torments – Margaret Culkin Banning
 Harry's Game – Gerald Seymour

Volume 111 – #5
 The Pride of the Peacock – Victoria Holt
 "Bobbitt" – Thomas Tryon
 The Experiment – Henry Denker
 Ordinary People – Judith Guest
 Storm Warning – Jack Higgins

1977

Volume 112 – #1
 Mrs. Pollifax on Safari – Dorothy Gilman
 The R Document – Irving Wallace
 Home Before Dark – Sue Ellen Bridgers
 The Glory Boys – Gerald Seymour
 The Spuddy – Lillian Beckwith

Volume 113 – #2
 The Slow Awakening – Catherine Marchant
 19 Steps Up the Mountain – Joseph P. Blank
 Ghost Fox – James Houston
 In the Frame – Dick Francis

Volume 114 – #3
 Tisha – Robert Specht
 The Dragon – Alfred Coppel
 Oliver's Story – Erich Segal
 Majesty – Robert Lacey
 Overboard – Hank Searls

Volume 115 – #4
 The Stone Bull – Phyllis Whitney
 Enola Gay – Gordon Thomas & Max Morgan Witts
 Sadie Shapiro in Miami – Robert Kimmel Smith
 The Scofield Diagnosis – Henry Denker

Volume 116 – #5
 The Melodeon – Glendon Swarthout
 Full Disclosure – William Safire
 Bel Ria – Sheila Burnford
 Chase the Wind – E. V. Thompson
 The Fan – Bob Randall

1978

Volume 117 – #1
 Snowbound Six – Richard Martin Stern
 The Summer of the Spanish Woman – Catherine Gaskin
 Elephants in the Living Room, Bears in the Canoe – Earl & Liz Hammond with Elizabeth Levy
 Arrest Sitting Bull – Douglas C. Jones
 I Can Jump Puddles – Alan Marshall

Volume 118 – #2
 Jaws 2 – Hank Searls
 The Education of Little Tree – Forrest Carter
 The Practice – Dr. Alan E. Nourse
 Excellency – David Beaty

Volume 119 – #3
 A Stranger is Watching – Mary Higgins Clark
 The Miracle of Dommatina – Ira Avery
 The Last Convertible – Anton Myrer
 Such a Life – Edith LaZebnik

Volume 120 – #4
 My Enemy the Queen – Victoria Holt
 The Good Old Boys – Elmer Kelton
 By the Rivers of Babylon – Nelson DeMille
 Breakpoint – William Brinkley

Volume 121 – #5
 Summer Lightning – Judith Richards
 Tara Kane – George Markstein
 Flight into Danger – Arthur Hailey & John Castle
 Raquela; A Woman Of Israel – Ruth Gruber
 The Snake – John Godey

1979

Volume 122 – #1
 Eye of the Needle – Ken Follett
 Orphan Train – James Magnuson & Dorothea Petrie
 Overload – Arthur Hailey
 A Dangerous Magic – Frances Lynch

Volume 123 – #2
 Dinah, Blow Your Horn – Jack Bickham
 War and Remembrance – Herman Wouk
 How I Got to be Perfect – Jean Kerr

Volume 124 – #3
 Sunflower – Marilyn Sharp
 Running Proud – Nicholas Monsarrat
 Error of Judgment – Henry Denker
 A Walk Across America – Peter Jenkins

Volume 125 – #4
 Sphinx – Robin Cook
 Cold is the Sea – Capt. Edward L. Beach Jr.
 Words by Heart – Ouida Sebestyen
 The North Runner – R. D. Lawrence
 Intruder – Louis Charbonneau

Volume 126 – #5
 Hungry as the Sea – Wilbur Smith
 The Tightrope Walker – Dorothy Gilman
 The Passing Bells – Phillip Rock
 Flesh and Spirit – Elizabeth Christman

1980s

1980

Volume 127 – #1
 Domino – Phyllis Whitney
 Passage West – Dallas Miller
 Horowitz and Mrs. Washington – Henry Denker
 To Catch a King – Harry Patterson

Volume 128 – #2
 Emma and I – Sheila Hocken
 The Devil's Alternative – Frederick Forsyth
 The Capricorn Stone – Madeleine Brent
 Flood – Richard Martin Stern

Volume 129 – M
 Amanda/Miranda – Richard Peck
 Ice Brothers – Sloan Wilson
 The Small Outsider – Joan Martin Hundley
 The Silver Falcon – Evelyn Anthony

Volume 130 – #3
 Thursday's Child  – Victoria Poole
 Random Winds – Belva Plain
 A Very Private War – Jon Cleary
 Control Tower – Robert P. Davis

Volume 131 – #4
 Sadie Shapiro, Matchmaker – Robert Kimmel Smith
 The Cradle Will Fall – Mary Higgins Clark
 Man, Woman and Child – Erich Segal
 Bess and Harry: An American Love Story – Jhan Robbins
 The Wolf and the Buffalo – Elmer Kelton

Volume 132 – #5
 No Job for a Lady – Phyllis Lose, V.M.D.
 The Key to Rebecca – Ken Follett
 The Old Neighborhood – Avery Corman
 A Piano for Mrs. Cimino – Robert Oliphant
 The Gold of Troy – Robert L. Fish

1981

Volume 133 – #1
 The Aviator – Ernest K. Gann
 The Covenant – James A. Michener
 Hope – Richard Meryman
 Bullet Train – Joseph Rance & Arei Kato

Volume 134 – #2
 One Child – Torey Hayden
 Banners of Silk – Rosalind Laker
 The Gentle Jungle – Toni Ringo Helfer
 Reflex – Dick Francis

Volume 135 – M
 Lincoln's Mothers: A Story of Nancy and Sally Lincoln – Dorothy Clarke Wilson
 The Last Step – Rick Ridgeway
 All the Days were Summer – Jack M. Bickham
 Flight to Landfall – G.M. Glaskin

Volume 136 – #3
 Still Missing – Beth Gutcheon
 A Princess in Berlin – Arthur Solmssen
 The Warfield Syndrome – Henry Denker
 The Dam – Robert Byrne

Volume 137 – #4
 The Lord God Made Them All – James Herriot
 An Exceptional Marriage – Jack Shepherd
 Texas Dawn – Phillip Finch
 Crossing in Berlin – Fletcher Knebel

Volume 138 – #5
 Vermilion – Phyllis Whitney
 Totaled – Frances Rickett & Steven McGraw
 Ike and Mamie: The Story of the General and His Lady – Lester David & Irene David
 The Dark Horse – Rumer Godden
 Fortress – Gabrielle Lord

1982

Volume 139 – #1
 Through the Narrow Gate – Karen Armstrong
 Noble House – James Clavell
 The Judas Kiss – Victoria Holt

Volume 140 – #2
 Alone Against the Atlantic – Gerry Spiess (with Marlin Bree)
 A Green Desire – Anton Myrer
 Going Wild: Adventures of a Zoo Vet – David Taylor
 The Man Who Lived at the Ritz – A. E. Hotchner

Volume 141 – M
 Fever – Robin Cook
 The Walk West: A Walk Across America 2 – Peter Jenkins
 Gilded Splendour – Rosalind Laker
 Twice Shy – Dick Francis

Volume 142 – #3
 The Man from St. Petersburg – Ken Follett
 Pioneer Women: Voices from the Kansas Frontier – Joanna Stratton
 No Escape – Joseph Hayes
 The Citadel – A.J. Cronin

Volume 143 – #4
 Flanagan's Run – Tom McNab
 A Parting Gift – Frances Sharkey, M.D.
 The Big Bridge – Richard Martin Stern
 Last Quadrant – Meira Chand

Volume 144 – #5
 Jane's House – Robert Kimmel Smith
 China: Alive In The Bitter Sea – Fox Butterfield
 Promises – Catherine Gaskin
 Outrage – Henry Denker

1983

Volume 145 – #1
 A Cry in the Night – Mary Higgins Clark
 Indian Summer of the Heart – Daisy Newman
 Touch the Devil – Jack Higgins
 The Winter of the White Seal – Marie Herbert

Volume 146 – #2
 Pacific Interlude – Sloan Wilson
 The Whip – Catherine Cookson
 Open Heart – Mary Bringle
 Banker – Dick Francis

Volume 147 – M
 The Girl of the Sea of Cortez – Peter Benchley
 Jedder's Land – Maureen O'Donoghue
 Run Before the Wind – Stuart Woods
 Impressionist: A Novel of Mary Cassatt – Joan King

Volume 148 – #3
 Mrs. Pollifax on the China Station – Dorothy Gilman
 The Brea File – Louis Charbonneau
 Growing Up – Russell Baker
 Octavia's Hill – Margaret Dickson

Volume 149 – #4
 The Secret Annie Oakley – Marcy Heidish
 Talk Down – Brian Lecomber
 Jewelled Path – Rosalind Laker
 A Solitary Dance – Robert Lane

Volume 150 – #5
 Godplayer – Robin Cook
 The Suitcases – Anne Hall Whitt
 The Time of the Hunter's Moon – Victoria Holt
 Stalking Point – Duncan Kyle

1984

Volume 151 – #1
 The Children's Game – David Wise
 Beyond All Frontiers – Emma Drummond
 The Incredible Journey – Sheila Burnford
 From This Day Forward – Nancy Rossi

Volume 152 – #2
 Arnie, The Darling Starling – Margarete Sigl Corbo & Diane Marie Barras
 Night Sky – Clare Francis
 The Canyon – Jack Schaefer
 If We Could Hear the Grass Grow – Eleanor Craig

Volume 153 – M
 The Cop and The Kid – William Fox with Noel Hynd
 Tiger, Tiger – Philip Caveney
 Kincaid – Henry Denker
 The Whale of the Victoria Cross – Pierre Boulle

Volume 154 – #3
 Skyscraper – Robert Byrne
 A Shine of Rainbows – Lillian Beckwith
 The Reckoning – Phillip Finch
 Lady Washington – Dorothy Clarke Wilson

Volume 155 – #4
 Nop's Trials – Donald McCaig
 Lee and Grant – Gene Smith
 Murder and the First Lady – Elliott Roosevelt
 Jennie About To Be – Elisabeth Ogilvie

Volume 156 – #5
 Hanna and Walter – Hanna & Walter Kohner
 Stormswift – Madeleine Brent
 The Sound of Wings – Spencer Dunmore
 Surprise Party – William Katz

1985

Volume 157 – #1
 Lovestrong – Dorothy Greenbaum, MD & Deidre Laiken
 Stillwatch – Mary Higgins Clark
 Crescent City – Belva Plain
 The Wild Children – Felice Holman

Volume 158 – #2
 Julie – Catherine Marshall
 Strong Medicine – Arthur Hailey
 Polsinney Harbour – Mary E. Pearce
 Proof – Dick Francis

Volume 159 – M
 The State of Stony Lonesome – Jessamyn West
 At The Going Down of the Sun – Elizabeth Darrell
 Callanish – William Horwood
 Find a Safe Place – Alexander Lazzarino & E. Kent Hayes

Volume 160 – #3
 In Love and War – Jim & Sybil Stockdale
 Ringo, the Robber Raccoon – Robert Franklin Leslie
 This Giving Heart – Hugh Miller
 Twilight Child – Warren Adler

Volume 161 – #4
 Robert, My Son – Henry Denker
 The Bannaman Legacy – Catherine Cookson
 The Cheetahs – Alan Caillou
 This Shining Land – Rosalind Laker

Volume 162 – #5
 Voices on the Wind – Evelyn Anthony
 Trauma – John Fried & John G. West, MD
 The Donkey's Gift – Thomas M. Coffey
 The Double Man – William Cohen & Gary Hart

1986

Volume 163 – #1
 Mrs. Pollifax and the Hong Kong Buddha – Dorothy Gilman
 Wildfire – Richard Martin Stern
 Arnie & a House Full of Company – Margarete Corbo & Diane Marie Barras
 Take Away One – Thomas Froncek
 The Two Farms – Mary Pearce

Volume 164 – #2
 An Ark on the Flood – Anne Knowles
 The Seventh Secret – Irving Wallace
 Come Spring – Charlotte Hinger
 Break In – Dick Francis

Volume 165 – M
 Deep Lie – Stuart Woods
 Bess W. Truman: An American Courtship – Margaret Truman
 In A Place Dark and Secret – Phillip Finch
 The Summer of the Barshinskeys – Diane Pearson

Volume 166 – #3
 Lie Down with Lions – Ken Follett
 Tree of Gold – Rosalind Laker
 The Deep End – Joy Fielding
 Cry Wild – R. D. Lawrence

Volume 167 – #4
 Silversword – Phyllis Whitney
 Texas – James Michener
 Bracken – Elizabeth Webster

Volume 168 – #5
 The Judgment – Howard Goldfluss
 Kaffir Boy – Mark Mathabane
 Unnatural Causes – Mark Olshaker
 Queen Dolley – Dorothy Clarke Wilson

1987

Volume 169 – #1
 A Matter of Honor – Jeffrey Archer
 The Golden Cup – Belva Plain
 Stepping Down from the Star – Alexandra Costa
 A Deadly Presence – Hjalmer Thesen

Volume 170 – #2
 A Place To Hide – Evelyn Anthony
 A Time For Heroes – Will Bryant
 East and West – Gerald Green
 Nightshade – Gloria Murphy

Volume 171 – M
 Carter's Castle – Wilbur Wright
 New Orleans Legacy – Alexandra Ripley
 To Kill the Potemkin – Mark Joseph
 Anne Frank Remembered – Miep Gies & Alison Leslie Gold

Volume 172 – #3
 Bolt – Dick Francis
 The Night Lives On – Walter Lord
 The Choice – Henry Denker
 The Ladies of Missalonghi – Colleen McCullough
 Night of the Fox – Jack Higgins

Volume 173 – #4
 Windmills of the Gods – Sidney Sheldon
 Unholy Matrimony – John Dillmann
 The Silver Touch – Rosalind Laker
 Outbreak – Robin Cook

Volume 174 – #5
 Patriot Games – Tom Clancy
 Snow on the Wind – Hugh Miller
 Memoirs of an Invisible Man – H. F. Saint
 The Man Who Rode Midnight – Elmer Kelton

1988

Volume 175 – #1
 Mrs. Pollifax and the Golden Triangle – Dorothy Gilman
 Not Without My Daughter – Betty Mahmoody with William Hoffer
 The Seizing of Yankee Green Mall – Ridley Pearson
 O Come Ye Back to Ireland – Niall Williams & Christine Breen

Volume 176 – #2
 Hot Money – Dick Francis
 Jenny's Mountain – Elaine Long
 Trespass – Phillip Finch
 Sara Dane – Catherine Gaskin

Volume 177 – M
 Wolf Winter – Clare Francis
 Johnnie Alone – Elizabeth Webster
 Man With a Gun – Robert Daley
 Winner – Maureen O'Donoghue

Volume 178 – #3
 Mortal Fear – Robin Cook
 Just Another Kid – Torey Hayden
 Rockets' Red Glare – Greg Dinallo
 Brownstone Facade – Catherine M. Rae

Volume 179 – #4
 Tsunami – Richard Martin Stern
 The Harrogate Secret – Catherine Cookson
 The Charm School – Nelson DeMille
 A Walk in the Dark – Joyce Stranger

Volume 180 – #5
 The India Fan – Victoria Holt
 Mannequin – Robert Byrne
 Lady of No Man's Land – Jeanne Williams
 Wildtrack – Bernard Cornwell

1989

Volume 181 – #1
 A Gift of Life – Henry Denker
 Daddy – Loup Durand
 Norman Rockwell's Greatest Painting – Hollis Hodges
 Murder in the Oval Office – Elliott Roosevelt

Volume 182 – #2
 The Edge – Dick Francis
 Alaska – James Michener
 Thornyhold – Mary Stewart

Volume 183 – M
 Doctors – Erich Segal
 Gracie – George Burns
 The Giant's Shadow – Thomas Bontly
 The Toothache Tree – Jack Galloway

Volume 184 – #3
 Morning Glory – LaVyrle Spencer
 Toy Soldiers – William P. Kennedy
 Trail – Louis Charbonneau
 Prospect – Bill Littlefield

Volume 185 – #4
 While My Pretty One Sleeps – Mary Higgins Clark
 The Bailey Chronicles – Catherine Cookson
 The Negotiator – Frederick Forsyth
 Hallapoosa – Robert Newton Peck

Volume 186 – #5
 Killer's Wake – Bernard Cornwell
 Blessings – Belva Plain
 Grass Roots – Stuart Woods
 Alice and Edith – Dorothy Clarke Wilson

1990s

1990

Volume 187 – #1
 Tiebreaker – Jack Bickham
 What was Good About Today – Carol Kruckeberg
 California Gold – John Jakes
 Monkeys on the Interstate – Jack Hanna w/ John Stravinsky

Volume 188 – #2
 Straight – Dick Francis
 No Roof But Heaven – Jeanne Williams
 The Evening News – Arthur Hailey
 The Courtship of Peggy McCoy – Ray Sipherd

Volume 189 – M
 The Lady of the Labyrinth – Caroline Llewellyn
 The Himmler Equation – William P. Kennedy
 Flying Free – Dan True
 A Time to Love – Beryl Kingston

Volume 190 – #3
 Harmful Intent – Robin Cook
 The Flight of the Swan – Elizabeth Webster
 The Estuary Pilgrim – Douglas Skeggs
 Manifest Destiny – Brian Garfield

Volume 191 – #4
 Cold Harbour – Jack Higgins
 Circle of Pearls – Rosalind Laker
 The Bear – James Oliver Curwood
 Finders Keepers – Barbara Nickolae

Volume 192 – #5
 Harvest – Belva Plain
 Purpose of Evasion – Greg Dinallo
 Snare of Serpents – Victoria Holt
 Coyote Waits – Tony Hillerman

1991

Volume 193 – #1
 Trial – Clifford Irving
 September – Rosamunde Pilcher
 The White Puma – R. D. Lawrence
 Mrs. Pollifax and the Whirling Dervish – Dorothy Gilman

Volume 194 – #2
 Longshot – Dick Francis
 The Women in His Life – Barbara Taylor Bradford
 Crackdown – Bernard Cornwell
 Something to Hide – Patricia Robinson

Volume 195 – #3
 The Firm – John Grisham
 Payment in Full – Henry Denker
 Final Approach – John J. Nance
 Home Ground – Hugh Miller

Volume 196 – #4
 As the Crow Flies – Jeffrey Archer
 Home Mountain – Jeanne Williams
 MacKinnon's Machine – S. K. Wolf
 Seal Morning – Rowena Farre

Volume 197 – #5
 The Eagle Has Flown – Jack Higgins
 Aspen Gold – Janet Dailey
 The Ice – Louis Charbonneau
 Lightning in July – Ann L. McLaughlin

Volume 198 – #6
 Loves Music, Loves to Dance – Mary Higgins Clark
 Lost and Found – Marilyn Harris
 Condition Black – Gerald Seymour
 Escape Into Light – Elizabeth Webster

1992

Volume 199 – #1
 Night Over Water – Ken Follett
 Doctor on Trial – Henry Denker
 Beast – Peter Benchley
 Dear Family – Camilla Bittle

Volume 200 – #2
 Comeback – Dick Francis
 Scarlett – Alexandra Ripley
 The Deceiver – Frederick Forsyth

Volume 201 – #3
 Acts of Faith – Erich Segal
 Hard Fall – Ridley Pearson
 Bygones – LaVyrle Spencer
 The Stormy Petrel – Mary Stewart

Volume 202 – #4
 Such Devoted Sisters – Eileen Goudge
 Rules of Encounter – William P. Kennedy
 The Love Child – Catherine Cookson
 American Gothic – Gene Smith

Volume 203 – #5
 The Pelican Brief – John Grisham
 Treasures – Belva Plain
 Eye of the Storm – Jack Higgins
 The Island Harp – Jeanne Williams

Volume 204 – #6
 Tangled Vines – Janet Dailey
 Stalk – Louis Charbonneau
 Anna – Cynthia Harrod-Eagles
 The Leading Lady – Betty White & Tom Sullivan

1993

Volume 205 – #1
 Every Living Thing – James Herriot
 All Around the Town – Mary Higgins Clark
 Colony – Anne Rivers Siddons
 Death Penalty – William J. Coughlin

Volume 206 – #2
 Driving Force – Dick Francis
 Sotah – Naomi Ragen
 The Doll's House – Evelyn Anthony
 The Bears and I – Robert Franklin Leslie

Volume 207 – #3
 Mrs. Washington and Horowitz, Too – Henry Denker
 Point of Impact – Stephen Hunter
 November of the Heart – LaVyrle Spencer
 Shooting Script – Gordon Cotler

Volume 208 – #4
 The Client – John Grisham
 Sweet Water – Christina Baker Kline
 Slow Through Eden – Gordon Glasco
 The Longest Road – Jeanne Williams

Volume 209 – #5
 Thunder Point – Jack Higgins
 The Venetian Mask – Rosalind Laker
 Final Argument – Clifford Irving
 Whispers – Belva Plain

Volume 210 – #6
 The Cat Who Went Into the Closet – Lillian Jackson Braun
 Homeland – John Jakes
 Tell Me No Secrets – Joy Fielding

1994

Volume 211 – #1
 I'll Be Seeing You – Mary Higgins Clark
 Honour Among Thieves – Jeffrey Archer
 Alex Haley's Queen – Alex Haley with David Stevens
 Mrs. Pollifax and the Second Thief – Dorothy Gilman

Volume 212 – #2
 Without Remorse – Tom Clancy
 The Old House at Railes – Mary Pearce
 Decider – Dick Francis
 King of the Hill – A. E. Hotchner

Volume 213 – #3
 A Dangerous Fortune – Ken Follett
 The Select – F. Paul Wilson
 Rivers of Gold – Janet Edmonds
 Hardscape – Justin Scott

Volume 214 – #4
 Fatal Cure – Robin Cook
 The Wrong House – Carol McD. Wallace
 Red Ink – Greg Dinallo
 Having Our Say – Sadie and Bessie Delany

Volume 215 – #5
 Daybreak – Belva Plain
 Disclosure – Michael Crichton
 St. Agnes' Stand – Tom Eidson
 The Fist of God – Frederick Forsyth

Volume 216 – #6
 Hidden Riches – Nora Roberts
 Phoenix Rising – John Nance
 Roommates – Max Apple
 White Harvest – Louis Charbonneau

1995

Volume 217 – #1
 The Chamber – John Grisham
 Remember Me – Mary Higgins Clark
 The Intruders – Stephen Coonts
 The Acorn Winter – Elizabeth Webster

Volume 218 – #2
 Tiger's Child – Torey Hayden
 Heat – Stuart Woods
 This Child is Mine – Henry Denker
 Wall of Brass – Robert Daley

Volume 219 – #3
 Prizes – Erich Segal
 Secret Missions – Michael Gannon
 Eyes of a Child – Richard North Patterson
 More Than Meets the Eye – Joan Brock & Derek Gill

Volume 220 – #4
 Acceptable Risk – Robin Cook
 Local Rules – Jay Brandon
 Salem Street – Anna Jacobs
 Fast Forward – Judy Mercer

Volume 221 – #5
 The Rainmaker – John Grisham
 The Carousel – Belva Plain
 Wedding Night – Gary Devon
 Cloud Shadows – Elizabeth Webster

Volume 222 – #6
 Let Me Call You Sweetheart – Mary Higgins Clark
 Children of the Dust – Clancy Carlile
 Mrs. Pollifax and the Lion-Killer – Dorothy Gilman
 The Magic Bullet – Harry Stein

1996

Volume 223 – #1
 A Place Called Freedom – Ken Follett
 The Horse Whisperer – Nicholas Evans
 The Apocalypse Watch – Robert Ludlum

Volume 224 – #2
 Come To Grief – Dick Francis
 Coming Home – Rosamunde Pilcher
 Blaze – Robert Somerlott
 That Camden Summer – LaVyrle Spencer

Volume 225 – #3
 The Final Judgment – Richard North Patterson
 Nathan's Run – John Gilstrap
 Dance of the Scarecrows – Ray Sipherd
 Implant – F. Paul Wilson

Volume 226 – #4
 Notorious – Janet Dailey
 Snow Wolf – Glenn Meade
 The Cat Who Said Cheese – Lilian Jackson Braun
 Mirage – Soheir Khashoggi

Volume 227 – #5
 The Zero Hour – Joseph Finder
 Rose – Martin Cruz Smith
 A Place For Kathy – Henry Denker
 The Judge – Steve Martini

Volume 228 – #6
 Moonlight Becomes You – Mary Higgins Clark
 The Outsider – Penelope Williamson
 Harvest – Tess Gerritsen
 The Falconer – Elaine Clark McCarthy

1997

Volume 229 – #1
 The Runaway Jury – John Grisham
 Critical Judgment – Michael Palmer
 Icon – Frederick Forsyth
 Capitol Offense – Senator Barbara Mikulski & Mary Louise Oates

Volume 230 – #2
 The Third Twin – Ken Follett
 Small Town Girl – LaVyrle Spencer
 To the Hilt – Dick Francis
 The Burning Man – Phillip Margolin

Volume 231 – #3
 A Woman's Place – Barbara Delinsky
 The Unlikely Spy – Daniel Silva
 The Cat Who Tailed a Thief – Lilian Jackson Braun
 Beyond Recognition – Ridley Pearson

Volume 232 – #4
 The Escape Artist – Diane Chamberlain
 Airframe – Michael Crichton
 Weeding Out the Tears – Jeanne White with Susan Dworkin
 Infinity's Child – Harry Stein

These 1997 volumes were also published as Reader's Digest Select Editions, and all succeeding volumes were published as Reader's Digest Select Editions.

References

Fiction anthologies
Condensed Books
Anthology series
Book series introduced in 1950